The Port of Ovidiu is one of the largest Romanian river ports, located in the city of Ovidiu on the Danube-Black Sea Canal.

References

Ports and harbours of Romania
Ovidiu